Maharashtrian is an adjective referring to something related to:

 Maharashtra, a state of India
 Marathi people 
 Marathi language

See also 
 Maharashtrian Brahmin
 Maharashtri, the medieval language
 Marathi (disambiguation)

Language and nationality disambiguation pages